Myroliubivka is a village in Beryslav Raion, Ukraine.

Russo-Ukraine War 
In March 2022, as a result of the 2022 Russian invasion of Ukraine, Russia began its occupation of the village. However, Ukraine performed a counter-attack in early October 2022. President Volodymyr Zelenskyy announced that the armed forces of Ukraine (AFU) liberated the village on 2 October 2022.

Population 
Distribution of the population by native language according to the 2001 census:

References

Villages in Beryslav Raion